The African Men's Olympic Qualifiers began in December 1998 and ended in May 2000 and was held to determine the African national teams for under 23 that will participate at the 2000 Summer Olympics football tournament held in Sydney.

Participants

Preliminary round

|}

First round

Group 1 

|}

Group 2

|}

Group 3

|}

Second round

Group 1

Group 2

Group 3

Ranking of second-placed teams

References 

Football qualification for the 2000 Summer Olympics
Football at the Summer Olympics – Men's African Qualifiers